IndiaOne Air is an Indian regional airline based in Ahmedabad. The airline began operations in August 2022 with a focus on providing regional connectivity between tier 2 and 3 cities in India.It is the first scheduled airline in India to operate single-engine aircraft.

History
IndiaOne Air received its No Objection Certificate from the Ministry of Civil Aviation in 2020, but due to COVID-19 pandemic, the launch was delayed. In April 2022, the airline inducted it first brand new aircraft. The proving flight was performed on 22 June 2022 and the air operator's certificate was granted to the airline on 24 June 2022. IndiaOne Air launched trial flights from Bhubaneswar to Jeypore on 3 August 2022. The airline commenced scheduled flight on 31 October 2022 from Bhubaneswar to Jeypore. This scheduled flight was the first flight to Jeypore since Indian Independence in 1947.

Destinations 
IndiaOne Air operates flights to the following destinations. Its hub is at Bhubaneswar in Odisha.

Fleet
As of December 2022, IndiaOne Air operates the following aircraft:

See also
List of airlines of India

References

Airlines established in 2020
Indian companies established in 2020
Airlines of India
Companies based in Gujarat
Indian brands
Low-cost carriers
Transport in Gujarat
Regional airlines